The Tachikawa Ki-36 (named Ida in Allied reporting code) was a Japanese army co-operation aircraft of World War II. It was a two-seat, low-wing monoplane with a single piston engine and fixed, tailwheel-type undercarriage.

Design and development
The prototype, fitted with a 450 hp (336 kW) Hitachi Army Type 98 Ha-13 engine, first flew on 20 April 1938. Having outperformed the Mitsubishi Ki-35 in comparative trials, the Ki-36 was designated the Army Type 98 Direct Co-operation Aircraft and ordered into production in November 1938. Production ended in January 1944 after a total of 1,334 Ki-36 had been built (Tachikawa 862 and Kawasaki 472).

Operational history
The Ki-36 first saw action in China where it saw success. Later, in the Pacific, it proved excessively vulnerable to opposing fighters. It was thereafter redeployed to the safer theater of China.
Towards the end of the war, the Ki-36 was employed as a kamikaze aircraft with a bomb of 500-kg (1,102-lb) fitted externally.

Variants
 Ki-55: Two-seat advanced trainer version.
 Ki-72: An evolved version with a 600-hp (447-kW) Hitachi Ha-38 engine and retractable undercarriage. Not built.

Operators
 

Chinese Communist Air Force operated two captured aircraft postwar as trainers until their retirement in early 1950s.

Indonesian People's Security Force

Imperial Japanese Army Air Force

Royal Thai Air Force

Specifications (Ki-36)

See also

References

Citations

Bibliography
  (new edition 1987 by Putnam Aeronautical Books, .)

External links

 The Ki-55 at the Royal Thai Air Force Museum
 The Ki-36 at the China Aviation Museum

Ki-36
Ki-36, Tachikawa
Low-wing aircraft
Single-engined tractor aircraft
Aircraft first flown in 1938